Francis William Webb (21 May 1836 – 4 June 1906) was an English railway engineer, responsible for the design and manufacture of locomotives for the London and North Western Railway (LNWR). Webb was born in Tixall Rectory, near Stafford, the second son of William Webb, Rector of Tixall.

Career

Crewe Works
Showing early interest in mechanical engineering, on 11 August 1851 at the age of fifteen he was articled as a pupil of Francis Trevithick at Crewe Works.  Webb joined the drawing office in 1856, at the end of his training. He became Chief Draughtsman on 1 March 1859. On 1 September 1861 he was appointed Works Manager at Crewe and Chief Assistant to John Ramsbottom. Whilst Works Manager Webb was responsible for the installation of Bessemer converters and the start of steel production at Crewe.

Bolton Iron and Steel Company
In July 1866 Webb resigned from the LNWR and moved to the Bolton Iron and Steel Co. as the manager. It has been suggested that this move was arranged by the LNWR management to enable him to gain experience of steel making.

Return to Crewe
Ramsbottom gave 12 months notice of his resignation in September 1870. Shortly afterwards the Works Manager, Thomas Stubbs, died aged 34. Stubbs may have been Ramsbottom's intended successor. The Chairman of the LNWR, Richard Moon, contacted Webb and invited him to return to Crewe. In October 1870 Moon was able to inform Webb that his appointment as Locomotive Superintendent had been approved. Webb's salary was set at £2,000 for the first year, and £3,000 for the second and subsequent years. Webb took up his position on 1 October 1871. Webb became Chief Mechanical Engineer when the post of Locomotive Superintendent was renamed. It appears that this happened soon after Webb took up his duties. At the same time he also became President of the Crewe Mechanics' Institute, where he had for some time taught engineering drawing during his first stay at Crewe. Webb remained as CME of the LNWR until 1 July 1903, having tendered his resignation in November 1902. His successor, George Whale, was appointed in April 1903. Whale took over Webb's position somewhat earlier than planned, as Webb became seriously ill in June.

Locomotive classes

Webb was responsible throughout his career for some highly successful standard locomotive classes, all built at Crewe in considerable numbers. Notable amongst these is the Precedent class of 2-4-0 (known as Jumbos), an 0-6-0 general purpose freight design, ("Coal Engine") and its 0-6-2 ("Coal Tank") variant, a celebrated 0-6-0 mixed traffic design ("Cauliflowers"), and an 0-8-0 freight locomotive with two compound variants and a simple expansion version produced in parallel, The last-mentioned was continuously developed and built down to LMS days, most earlier locomotives being rebuilt to conform.

Controversy
There does however remain some controversy over Webb's own two distinct compound systems applied to a number of locomotive designs, which are reputed to have given considerable trouble in service. The Webb Experiment or Improved Precedent class were withdrawn by his successor George Whale soon after he succeeded Webb in 1903.

An obituary in The Engineer (8 June 1906) criticised his express compound design, which used un-coupled high and low pressure cylinders, a design promoted by Webb alone. The article caused open debate in the pages of the journal, mostly based on the perceived flaw of not utilising coupling rods. In the 20 June edition the editor of the journal continued the attack on the deceased engineer, stating:

Other work
Webb was also responsible for the remodelling of Crewe station which involved the building of four tracks in underpasses on the west side of the station to carry freight trains.

He made numerous inventions and received over 80 patents.  He was Vice-President of the Institution of Civil Engineers and the Institution of Mechanical Engineers.

Political life
Webb took a great interest in local politics and was an Alderman on the Crewe Town Council and was Mayor twice, in 1887 and 1888. He was also an Alderman on Cheshire County Council - useful for the LNWR as the council controlled matters relating to the railway, including the rates the company paid. Webb also served as a magistrate.

Philanthropy
In Crewe he was for very many years remembered as a major benefactor of the "Webb Orphanage", a beautiful red-brick building with extensive playing fields behind the railway works and fronting on Victoria Avenue

In 1887, together with Richard Moon, chairman of the LNWR, he presented, to the Crewe Corporation, on behalf of the railway company, Queen's Park, a large and beautifully landscaped park with attractive entrance gates and lodges (complete with inscribed decoration mentioning both Moon and Webb) and also fronting on Victoria Avenue. He also helped Crewe Alexandra cricket club relocate from the Alexandra Recreation Ground on Nantwich Road to a new ground off Earle Street in 1898.

"Frank Webb Avenue", a much later Crewe residential street, also recalls his name.

Retirement and death
He retired in 1903 to Bournemouth, where he died in 1906, aged 70. He had never married.

Locomotive designs
LNWR 1201 0-4-0ST
LNWR 17in Coal Engine 0-6-0
LNWR Webb Precursor Class 2-4-0
LNWR Precedent Class 2-4-0
LNWR Chopper Tank Class 2-4-2T
LNWR 4ft 6in Tank Class 2-4-2T
LNWR 18in Goods Class 0-6-0
LNWR Webb Coal Tank 0-6-2
LNWR Special DX class 2-4-0
LNWR Webb Experiment Class 2-4-0
LNWR Dreadnought Class 2-2-2-0
LNWR Improved Precedent Class 2-4-0
LNWR Teutonic Class 2-2-2-0
LNWR Waterloo Class 2-4-0
LNWR 5ft 6in Tank Class 2-4-2T
LNWR Greater Britain Class 2-2-2-0
LNWR Class A 0-8-0
LNWR John Hick Class 2-2-2-0
LNWR Dock Tank 0-4-2ST
LNWR 18in Tank Class 2-4-2T
LNWR Jubilee Class 4-4-0
LNWR Alfred the Great Class 4-4-0
LNWR Class B 0-8-0
LNWR 1400 Class 4-6-0

References

Notes

Bibliography

Literature

Publications

External links

1836 births
1906 deaths
Presidents of the Smeatonian Society of Civil Engineers
English mechanical engineers
English railway mechanical engineers
Locomotive builders and designers
London and North Western Railway people
People from Stafford